Paradeniz (literally "semi sea") is a lagoon along the Mediterranean Sea shore in Turkey. It is part of a lagoon system composed of four lakes.

Geography 

Paradeniz is in Silifke district of Mersin Province, Turkey. It is at the west of the  river, south west of the town Arkum, north of the cape İncekum and east of the town Taşucu.

Location 

East shore line of Paradeniz lies more or less parallel to Mediterranean Sea shore. The salinity is  ‰ 19, which is less than that of Mediterranean Sea.

Ecology 
Paradeniz together with the surrounding area is an important breeding and wintering area for the waterbirds. The number of bird species which were determined around Paradeniz is as high as 302  Paradeniz is also a fishery. By controlling the  narrow channel to sea,  fishes are trapped and harvested. The best known Paradeniz produce is blue crab (Callinectes sapidus).

References

Landforms of Mersin Province
Lakes of Turkey
Silifke District